Temple of Justice may refer to:

 Temple of Justice (Liberia)
 Temple of Justice (Washington)